WLAS may refer to:

 WLAS-LP, a low-power radio station (102.9 FM) licensed to serve Auburndale, Massachusetts, United States
 WLAS-LP (defunct), a defunct low-power radio station (96.1 FM) formerly licensed to serve Bartow, Florida, United States
 WSHY, a radio station (1410 AM) licensed to Lafayette, Indiana, United States, which held the call sign WLAS from August 2002 to May 2007